Abul Muzaffar Manuchehr was the seventeenth independent Shah of Shirvan.

Reign
Very little information is known about his reign except numismatics. He was likely emir of Ganja during his father's reign.

References

11th-century Iranian people
12th-century Iranian people